Hayley Chapman (born 19 January 1992) is an Australian sport shooter representing Australia at the 2012 Summer Olympics in shooting in the 25m pistol event where she placed 34th out of 39.

Personal
Chapman was born on 19 January 1992 in Balaklava, South Australia. She grew up on a farm in Hoyleton, South Australia and attended Horizon Christian School for primary and secondary school.  In 2011, she enrolled at the University of South Australia in a  Bachelor of Management and Marketing course. , she lives in Hoyleton, South Australia.

Her father is David Chapman. She thought her father looked a bit embarrassing wearing the Olympic team track suit.

Shooting
Chapman is a sport shooter specialising in pistol shooting.  She started the sport after having  fun at her father's national titles competition in 2006. She is a member of the Balaklava Sports Shooting Club, and has shooting scholarships with the South Australian Sports Institute and South Australia Rifle Pistol Association. She was coached by her father. Since 2008, she has also been coached by Anatoly Babushkin. She was a member of the Australian shooting development squad, which aimed to prepare her for the 2012 Summer Olympics.

At the 2008 Youth Commonwealth Games in India, Chapman won a bronze medal. That year, she competed in the Junior Women's National Championship, where she finished first in the 10m air pistol event.  At the 2008 Australian Cup, she finished fourth in the women's open division 10m air pistol event. At the 2011 World Cup 4 in Munich, Germany, she finished 73rd in the 25m pistol event. In the 10m air pistol event, she finished 118th with a score of 362.

Olympics
Chapman was selected to represent Australia at the 2012 Summer Olympics in shooting in the 25 metre pistol event.  As a twenty-year-old, she was nominated to compete alongside her father in London, the first time an Australian father-daughter pair competed in the Olympics at the same Games.  She qualified at a Munich-based World Cup event in June, the last available event open to earn a spot.

Pictures of Chapman and her father were published in a Melbourne area newspaper.  These pictures were discussed in the context of the Australian Olympic Committee actions surrounding two swimmers who posed with guns.

References

External links
 
 
 
 
 
 

Australian female sport shooters
Olympic shooters of Australia
Shooters at the 2012 Summer Olympics
1992 births
Living people
People from Balaklava, South Australia
Commonwealth Games competitors for Australia
Shooters at the 2014 Commonwealth Games
20th-century Australian women
21st-century Australian women